The 1938 Rose Bowl was the 24th edition of the college football bowl game, played at the Rose Bowl in Pasadena, California, on Saturday, January 1. The game featured the second-ranked California Golden Bears of the Pacific Coast Conference (PCC) against the #4 Alabama Crimson Tide of the Southeastern Conference (SEC), two of the top teams from the 1937 college football season. This game was the fifth trip to Pasadena for the Tide, which had gone without a loss in the previous four.

Teams

California

Alabama

Game summary
The game was a Vic Bottari and Sam Chapman show, as the duo combined for all 13 points. It was Alabama's first loss in the Rose Bowl, which prompted former Los Angeles Examiner reporter Maxwell Stiles to write: “The Crimson Tide was at its ebb, Alabama at last had lost a Rose Bowl Game.”

Scoring

First quarter
No scoring

Second quarter
Cal – Vic Bottari, 4-yard run (Sam Chapman kick good)

Third quarter
Cal – Bottari, 5-yard run (Chapman kick failed)

Fourth quarter
No scoring

Aftermath
California's record in the Rose Bowl improved to 2–1–1, but this remains their most recent victory, with four losses since.

Alabama's record in Pasadena dropped to 3–1–1; their next Rose Bowl was a win in January 1946, the last edition prior to the exclusive agreement with the Big Nine (now Big Ten). The Tide played in three major bowls in between, with two wins.

References

1937–38 NCAA football bowl games
1938
1938
1938
1938 in sports in California
January 1938 sports events